Legislative elections were held in South West Africa on 30 August 1950. The whites-only election saw a victory for the National Party of South West Africa, which won 15 of the 18 seats in the Legislative Assembly.

Electoral system
Prior to the elections, the electoral system was reformed; previously 12 members had been elected from single-member constituencies and six members appointed by the Administrator. Under the new system, all 18 members were elected in single-member constituencies. Four constituencies (Gibeon, Stampriet, Windhoek Central and Windhoek District) were abolished, leaving the new constituencies as Aroab, Gobabis, Grootfontein, Keetmanshoop, Luderitz, Maltahöhe, Mariental, Okahandja, Otjikondo, Otjiwarongo, Outjo, Rehoboth, Swakopmund, Usakos, Warmbad, Windhoek East, Windhoek North and Windhoek West.

Results

References

South West Africa
1950 in South West Africa
Elections in Namibia
Election and referendum articles with incomplete results